Bertram William Henry Poole (March 22, 1880 – September 8, 1957) was an American student of philately, and wrote numerous monographs on various aspects of the hobby. He was well known as a respected philatelist in Great Britain before emigrating to the United States shortly before 1913.

British philatelist
Poole was editor of the West End Philatelist and The Philatelic Journal of Great Britain. He wrote extensively on British Colonies in all seven of the West End Philatelist Handbooks. He also wrote numerous articles on postage stamps and postal history of Bulgaria, Dominica, Seychelles, Sarawak and South Africa.

American philatelist
Poole wrote a number of monographs on European and British colonial postage stamps which were published in Mekeels Handbook between 1912 and 1923. He contributed numerous articles to other philatelic journals and authored the books: The Standard Philatelic Dictionary in 1922 and The Pioneer Stamps of the British Empire in 1957. He also published his own Philatelic Opinion journal from 1912 to 1931. And, in 1917 he co-authored United States Virgin Islands with Julius (John) Murray Bartels.

Collecting interests
Poole had a broad depth of collecting interests, but tended to specialize in stamps of Haiti and South and Central America. He was active in philatelic societies and was appointed judge at the 1913 International Philatelic Exhibition in New York City. Poole also was a stamp dealer and auctioneer.

Honors and awards
Poole, as one of the original signers, signed the Roll of Distinguished Philatelists in 1921. He was named to the American Philatelic Society Hall of Fame in 1993.

Selected publications

Sarawak: A Complete History of its Postage Stamps. London: D. Field, 1906.
The Stamps of Cook Islands. Boston: Mekeel-Severn-Wylie, 1912. (Mekeels Handbook #1)

References
 Bertram William Henry Poole

External links
 
 

1880 births
1957 deaths
British emigrants to the United States
Philatelic literature
American philatelists
American stamp dealers
People from Los Angeles
Signatories to the Roll of Distinguished Philatelists
American Philatelic Society